The Islamic Society of Greater Dayton (ISGD) is a Sunni Muslim community organization based in Dayton, Ohio. The organization includes a mosque on Josie Street. Regular activities at the mosque include worship services, outreach, language classes, and religious classes. 

In September 2008, two attackers reportedly sprayed a chemical agent into the windows of the Josie Street mosque during a Ramadan worship service. Worshipers left in discomfort. The incident was investigated as a possible hate crime. The attack followed the distribution of Obsession, an anti-Islamic movie, in the Dayton region. 

The ISGD owns and maintains land that is used as a traditional Islamic cemetery. 

The ISGD is planning on moving to new facilities in Sugarcreek Township outside Dayton. The township approved the plans in 2008. Construction on the mosque is continuing as of April 2014.

See also
 List of mosques in the Americas
 Lists of mosques
 List of mosques in the United States

References

External links 

Islam in Ohio
Islamic organizations based in the United States
Religious buildings and structures in Ohio
Mosques in Ohio
Culture of Dayton, Ohio
Buildings and structures in Dayton, Ohio
Sunni mosques in the United States